Craven Dam is at the confluence of the Qu'Appelle River and Last Mountain Creek and immediately east of the village of Craven on the Qu'Appelle River at SW 24-20-21 W2. It is in the Canadian province of Saskatchewan in the RM of Longlaketon No. 219. The dam does not create a reservoir as its purpose is to regulate water flow along the Qu'Appelle River. The dam is operated by the Saskatchewan Water Security Agency and can be accessed on the north side by Highway 99.

Craven Dam is the dividing point between the upper and lower watersheds of the Qu'Appelle River.

The original Craven Dam was built in 1943 and did not include a fishway. Starting in August of 2002 and finishing in 2003, Agriculture and Agri-Food Canada rebuilt the dam. At the upstream end of the fishway, there is a 1.5 by 1.5-metre gated bay.

Water flow can be reduced through the dam's gates so that water backfloods up Last Mountain Creek and into Last Mountain Lake. In that case, Last Mountain Lake, which is a natural lake, becomes a reservoir. When the dam's gates are open, water from Last Mountain Lake and the Qu'Appelle River flow east and downstream into Pasqua Lake, which is one of the Fishing Lakes.

The fishway is designed with bays that allow researchers to drop a steel fish trap to capture fish for study. Passive Integrated Transponder (PIT) tags were implemented into the abdominal cavity of fish and used to assess fish movements through the fishway. Some of the fished being monitored include the bigmouth buffalo, common carp, lake whitefish, northern pike, quillback, walleye, white sucker, and yellow perch.

See also 
 List of dams and reservoirs in Canada
 Saskatchewan Water Security Agency
 Qu'Appelle River Dam
 Katepwa Dam

References 

Dams in Saskatchewan